Taxi Brooklyn is a French-American action comedy police procedural television series, produced by EuropaCorp Television. The series stars Chyler Leigh and Jacky Ido, and is based upon the film Taxi written by Luc Besson. On March 6, 2015, NBC canceled the series in the United States.

Synopsis
Caitlin "Cat" Sullivan is an NYPD detective working in Brooklyn. After her driving privileges are suspended, she relies on Leo Romba, a Brooklyn cab driver from France. Leo becomes Cat's driver and a de facto consultant on her cases. While solving crimes with Leo, Cat is also running her own unauthorized investigation into the death of her father, an NYPD detective thought to have been killed by the Capella crime family. In doing so, she clashes with her boss, Captain Baker, and her ex-husband Gregg, who has picked up the case for the FBI.

Cast

Main
 Chyler Leigh as Detective Caitlin Mary Darcy "Cat" Sullivan, a second-generation, Irish-American detective with the fictional 125th Precinct (in reality, the precinct that serves the Prospect Park area is the 78th Precinct).  She achieved some level of notoriety after capturing the "Prospect Park Stalker".  After her driving privileges are suspended, she commandeers Leo Romba, a French taxi driver, to become her personal valet.  She is recently divorced from FBI Special Agent Gregg James.  She attended Catholic school, where she was starting point guard during her senior year on both her school's All-City and All-State teams, but is now a lapsed Catholic.  Growing up, she was best friends with Annabella Capella (Justine Cotsonas), the granddaughter of the head of the Capella crime family who has since taken over the family business.  She is highly uncomfortable with her mother's affair with the police captain. Her late father was a dirty cop on the Capella family's payroll, who murdered Annabella's grandfather to escape an Internal Affairs investigation, and was killed in revenge. 
 Jacky Ido as Leo Romba, a Brooklyn cab driver from Marseille, France, who becomes Cat's driver and a consultant for the 125th Precinct.  He spent four years in a French prison for serving as a getaway driver; he testified against the robbers and spent two years in solitary confinement.  As a result, Leo has developed claustrophobia.  He has a son, Nico, that he loves very much, and an ex-wife, Aimee, who has since remarried.  He considers Frankie (Cat's mother) a close friend.  In "Revenge", it is revealed that Aimee is separated from her new husband; she and Nico are kidnapped immediately after their arrival in New York by Leo's former partner-in-crime, Henry.
 James Colby as Captain John Baker, the commander of the 125th Precinct.  He is Cat's godfather, and recently he has begun an affair with her mother. 
 José Zúñiga as Detective Eddie Esposito, Cat's co-worker and rival at the 125th Precinct.
 Jennifer Esposito as Dr. Monica Pena, a medical examiner with the Brooklyn Borough Office of the Chief Medical Examiner and a friend of Cat's.
 Bill Heck as Special Agent Gregg James, an FBI agent and Cat's ex-husband.  In "Revenge", he is shot by a Capella family shooter.
 Ally Walker as Frankie Sullivan, Cat's widowed mother. She and Leo are good friends.
 Raul Casso as Ronnie, a fellow cab driver and a close friend of Leo's; notable for a mock-flamboyant personality.

Recurring
 Luke Roberts as Rhys
 Caterina Murino as Giada

Episodes

Broadcast
Taxi Brooklyn premiered in Belgium on March 21, 2014, on La Deux, and in France on April 14, 2014, on TF1. In the United States, the series premiered on June 25, 2014, on NBC, and in both Australia and the United Kingdom on May 25, 2015 on Netflix.

Reception
On Rotten Tomatoes season 1 has an approval rating of 35% based on reviews from 6 positive and 11 negative critic reviews.  The website consensus reads: "It's decent summer escapism, but Taxi Brooklyn's storylines detour too much to ring true."

References

External links
  (TF1)
  (NBC)
 

2010s American comedy-drama television series
2010s American crime drama television series
2010s American police comedy television series
2010s French comedy television series
2014 American television series debuts
2014 American television series endings
2014 French television series debuts
2014 French television series endings
American action comedy television series
Brooklyn in fiction
English-language television shows
Fictional portrayals of the New York City Police Department
French action television series
French police procedural television series
NBC original programming
Taxi (film series)
Television shows filmed in New York City
Television shows set in Brooklyn
TF1 original programming
French comedy-drama television series
2010s French drama television series